The 1969 Monte Carlo Open was a combined men's and women's tennis tournament played on outdoor clay courts at the Monte Carlo Country Club in Roquebrune-Cap-Martin, France. It was the 63rd edition of the event and was held from 15 April through 21 April 1969. Tom Okker and Ann Jones won the singles titles.

Finals

Men's singles
 Tom Okker defeated  John Newcombe 8–10, 6–1, 7–5, 6–3

Women's singles
 Ann Jones defeated  Virginia Wade 6–1, 6–3

Men's doubles
 Owen Davidson /  John Newcombe defeated  Pancho Gonzales /  Dennis Ralston 7–5, 11–13, 6–2, 6–1

Women's doubles
 Ann Jones /  Virginia Wade defeated  Gail Chanfreau /  Françoise Dürr 1–6, 6–4, 6–3

Mixed doubles
 Françoise Dürr /  Jean-Claude Barclay defeated  Ann Jones /  Fred Stolle 6–4, 6–4

References

External links
 
 ATP tournament profile
 ITF tournament edition details

Monte-Carlo Masters
Monte Carlo Open
Monte Carlo Open
Monte
Monte Carlo Open